The Tel Aviv Open is an ATP World Tour affiliated tennis tournament. It was played from 1978 through 1981 and 1983 through 1996 and was to be resumed in 2014, marking the end of the tournament in St. Petersburg, however, the 2014 edition was cancelled due to security concerns arising from the ongoing war with the neighboring Gaza Strip, the event was scrapped permanently in 2015. On June 21, 2022, it was announced that the tournament would take place in 2022, albeit in a different venue than previous editions.

The tournament is held at the Israel Tennis Center in the Tel Aviv District city of Ramat HaSharon, Israel and is played on outdoor hard courts.  The tournament was played as an ATP Challenger Series event in 1978, 1998 and 1999.  Israeli tennis player Amos Mansdorf appeared in the final five times, winning in 1987, making him the only Israeli to win the event.  Jimmy Connors won his final career singles title at the event in 1989.

In 1990 and 1991 the tournament was known as the Riklis Classic before reverting to the Tel Aviv Open for the remainder of its existence.

The tournament still holds the ATP record for the youngest winner of an ATP event (Aaron Krickstein in 1983, at the age of 16 and 2 months).

Finals

Singles

Doubles

References

ATP Vault

 
Tennis tournaments in Israel
Hard court tennis tournaments
ATP Tour
Defunct tennis tournaments in Asia
Sport in Tel Aviv
Defunct sports competitions in Israel